Budha is the Sanskrit word for the planet Mercury. Budha is also a deity.

He is also known as Soumya (Sanskrit: सौम्य, lit. son of Moon), Rauhineya and Tunga and is the Nakshatra lord of Ashlesha, Jyeshtha and Revati.

Planet
Budha as a planet appears in various Hindu astronomical texts in Sanskrit, such as the 5th century Aryabhatiya by Aryabhatta, the 6th century Romaka by Latadeva and Panca Siddhantika by Varahamihira, the 7th century Khandakhadyaka by Brahmagupta, and the 8th century Sisyadhivrddida by Lalla. These texts present Budha as one of the planets and estimate the characteristics of the respective planetary motion. Other texts such as Surya Siddhanta dated to have been complete sometime between the 5th century and 10th century present their chapters on various planets with deity mythologies.

The manuscripts of these texts exist in slightly different versions, present Budha's motion in the skies, but vary in their data, suggesting that the text were open and revised over their lives. The texts slightly disagree in their data, in their measurements of Budha's revolutions, apogee, epicycles, nodal longitudes, orbital inclination, and other parameters. For example, both Khandakhadyaka and Surya Siddhanta of Varaha state that Budha completes 17,937,000 revolutions on its own axis every 4,320,000 years, and had an apogee (aphelia) of 220 degrees in 499 CE; while another manuscript of Surya Siddhanta increases the revolutions by 60 to 17,937,060, and the apogee to 220 degrees and 26 seconds.

The 1st millennium CE Hindu scholars had estimated the time it took for sidereal revolutions of each planet including Budha, from their astronomical studies, with slightly different results:

Legends
Budha appears as a deity in Indian texts, often as the son of Soma (a moon god, alternatively known as Chandra) and Tara (wife of Bṛhaspati, the god of Jupiter). He is described as the son of goddess Rohini (a daughter of Daksha) and the god Chandra. Budha had only one offspring, King Pururavas, by his spouse Ila.

One of the earliest mentions of Budha as a celestial body appears in the Vedic text Pancavimsa Brahmana, and it appears in other ancient texts such as the Shatapatha Brahmana as well, but not in the context of astrology. In the Vedas, Budha is linked to three steps of the Hindu god Vishnu.

Calendar and Hindu astrology
Budha is the root of the word 'Budhavara' or Wednesday in the Hindu calendar. The word "Wednesday" in the Greco-Roman and other Indo-European calendars is also dedicated to planet Mercury ("day of Woden or Oden"). 

Budha is part of the Navagraha in Hindu zodiac system, considered benevolent, associated with an agile mind and memory. The role and importance of the Navagraha developed over time with various influences. Deifying planetary bodies and their astrological significance occurred as early as the Vedic period and was recorded in the Vedas. The earliest work of astrology recorded in India is the Vedanga Jyotisha which began to be compiled in the 14th century BCE. The classical planets, including Mercury, were referenced in the Atharvaveda around 1000 BCE.

The Navagraha was furthered by additional contributions from Western Asia, including Zoroastrian and Hellenistic influences. The Yavanajataka, or Science of the Yavanas, was written by the Indo-Greek named "Yavanesvara" ("Lord of the Greeks") under the rule of the Western Kshatrapa king Rudrakarman I. The Yavanajataka written in 120 CE is often attributed to standardizing Indian astrology. The Navagraha would further develop and culminate in the Shaka era with the Saka, or Scythian, people. Additionally the contributions by the Saka people would be the basis of the Indian national calendar, which is also called the Saka calendar.

Budha is also the root for name for the week day in many other Indian languages. In modern Hindi, Odia, Telugu, Bengali, Marathi, Urdu, Kannada and Gujarati, Wednesday is called Budhavara; Tamil: Budhan kizhamai; Malayalam: Budhanazhcha; Thai: Wan Phut.

Iconography

Budha's iconography, according to Roshen Dalal, is as a benevolent but a minor male deity with light yellow colored (or green) body, draped into yellow clothes,  holding a scimitar, a club, and a shield. He is canonically represented riding a chariot made of air and fire, drawn by eight wind horses; but in some illustrations, he rides a lion and has four arms, and in Bhudhan Temple he is depicted riding a winged lion.

Budha has been linguistically related to  Buddha, the founder of Buddhism, though this is controversial

See also

 Days of the week
 Navagraha
 List of Navagraha temples
 Nakshatra
 List of Natchathara temples
 Jyotisha
 Saptarishi
 List of Hindu deities

References

Further reading
 

 

 

 

Navagraha
Mercurian deities
Hindu gods
 Characters in the Mahabharata